Rajendran is an Indian family name and surname found mostly amongst South Indian people. The word means brave, big, sublime, fear, evil, loud, rough, bright, cold, strong, active, moving, heavy, mighty etc.

Notable people
A. Rajendran, Indian politician
A.R. Rajendran, Indian film editor, worked in the film Saajan
C. P. Rajendran, Indian geologist
C. Rajendran, Indian politician
C. V. Rajendran, Indian film director
Charlene Rajendran, Malaysian writer
K. P. Rajendran, Indian politician
Kusala Rajendran, Indian seismologist
Lenin Rajendran, Indian film director and screenwriter
M. D. Rajendran, Indian musical artist
M. M. Rajendran, Indian politician
M. S. K. Rajendran, Indian politician
Mathivanan Rajendran, Indian actor
N. P. Rajendran, Indian journalist
Nawab Rajendran, social activist and journalist from Kerala, India
P. G. Rajendran, Indian politician
P. Rajendran, Indian politician
P. V. Rajendran, Indian politician
R. Rajendran, Indian politician
S. K. Rajendran, Indian politician
S. N. Rajendran, Indian politician
S. Rajendran (AIADMK politician)
S. Rajendran (CPI politician)
S. Rajendran (CPI(M) politician)
S. S. Rajendran, Indian politician
Saba Rajendran, Indian politician
Thrissur C. Rajendran, Indian musician
Viduthalai Rajendran

See also
Rajendran Raja

References

Indian surnames
Surnames